The Ministry of Defense of the Kyrgyz Republic, formerly known as the State Committee for Defense Affairs, is the main executive body responsible for the Armed Forces of Kyrgyzstan, having the authority to is responsible for the readiness of the military command and the control bodies in its ranks. In accordance with legislation connected to the armed forces. The current Minister of Defense is Major General Baktybek Bekbolotov.

History
The Ministry was formed from the headquarters of the 17th Army Corps, after the dissolution of the Soviet Union in 1991-92. Originally, it was named the State Defense Committee, by order of President Askar Akayev on January 13, 1992. In 1993, the State Defense Committee was renamed to the Ministry of Defense of the Kyrgyz Republic. In November 2015, the Ministry of Defense was renamed the State Committee for Defense Affairs. In 2018, the Jogorku Kenesh raised the issue of restoring the Ministry of Defense, with Deputy Almambet Shykmamatov saying that Generals of the General Staff are not recognized abroad, since in other countries this body is "just an office" that coordinates the work of different agencies. Following the inauguration of President Sadyr Japarov in early February 2021, the Ministry of Defense was reestablished. This came after a poll appeared on the General Staff's Facebook page asking whether citizens consider it necessary to re-create the ministry, with the majority supporting the idea.

Regular Duties
The committee is at present, responsible for organizing the Armed Forces of Kyrgyzstan, which is done through the following actions:

 Reporting to the President and Government of Kyrgyzstan on the status of the armed forces
 Carrying out public military policy implemented by the government 
 Management, oversight, and execution of military activities 
 Administration of all institutions related to the military through the Chief of the General Staff
 Equipping the different service branches of the armed forces with the latest in military technology

In February 2014, the powers of the General Staff was expanded to give the Chief of General Staff the authority to have complete control over the armed forces. The Ministry of Defense's functions, on the other hand, were largely reduced, leaving its comprehensive support of the military as its mandate. In a 2015 military reform, the two departments became completely independent, with the chairman of the State Committee on Defense Affairs effectively being subordinated to the Chief of General Staff.

Leadership structure 

Minister of Defense – Baktybek Bekbolotov
First Deputy Minister of Defense – Nurlan Kiresheyev
Chief of the General Staff – Erlis Terdikbayev
Deputy Minister of Defense – Colonel Almazbek Karasartov
Deputy Minister of Defense – Colonel Akylbek Ibraev
Commander of the South-West Operational Command – Colonel Ruslan Mukambetov

List of leaders

See also 
 Armed Forces of the Republic of Kyrgyzstan
 Politics of Kyrgyzstan

References

External links 
Official website
Пресс-служба ГКДО КР

Government ministries of Kyrgyzstan
Ministry of Defence (Kyrgyzstan)
Military of Kyrgyzstan